() is a 1989 Japanese film directed by Shuichi Nagasaki.

Cast
Kumiko Akiyoshi as Miyako Shinohara 
Kiwako Harada as Harumi Yoshii 
Masao Kusakari as  Kazuhiko Sotomura  
Renji Ishibashi as Tsuburagi

See also
List of lesbian, gay, bisexual or transgender-related films

External links

1980s Japanese-language films
Japanese LGBT-related films
Lesbian-related films
1989 films
1980s Japanese films